Why Born Enslaved? or Why Born a Slave? (French: Pourquoi! Naitre esclave? or La Negresse) is a life-sized bust by the French sculptor Jean-Baptiste Carpeaux depicting a bound woman of African descent. Carpeaux executed versions of the sculpture in plaster, marble, terracotta, and bronze. It is represented in a number of museums, including the Ny Carlsberg Glyptotek in Copenhagen (marble, 1869) and the Metropolitan Museum of Art in New York City (marble, 1873).

History
While the composition, modeled in 1868, debuted at the Paris Salon in 1869 and was reproduced in various media, the marble version was carved in 1873. Carpeaux added the inscription in French, "Pourquoi naître esclave?" (Why born a slave?). The work was a preparatory work for the commission he had for the Fontaine de l'Observatoire, a fountain in the Jardin Marco Polo, south of the Jardin du Luxembourg in the 6th arrondissement of Paris.

Carpeaux explored the theme of slavery in his artwork after abolition in France in 1848 and the end of the United States Civil War in 1865.

Versions
 An 1867 polychromed plaster version, used as a master to cast other bronze versions of the bust, was acquired by the Cleveland Museum of Art in 2022.
 An 1868 bronze version titled The Negress is in the permanent collection of the Indianapolis Museum of Art.
 An 1869 marble version of the bust is in the collection of the Ny Carlsberg Glyptotek (MIN 1671) in Copenhagen. In 1911 it was acquired by the Carlsberg Foundation from Eugène Plantié in Caen and presented to the museum.
 The Metropolitan Museum of Art in New York City owns a terracotta version (1872) and a marble version (1873).
 Another version is in the Musée des beaux-arts de la ville de Paris in Paris.
 Another version of the bust is owned by the National Gallery of Poland.

Derivatives
Why Born Enslaved is the basis for Kara Walker's 2017 statue Negress, which is a plaster cast made from the bust where the bust's face forms a void within it.

See also 
 Fontaine de l'Observatoire

References

External links 

 Why Born Enslaved! (modeled 1868, carved 1873) - marble version at The Met Museum
 Why Born Enslaved! (1872) - terra cotta version at The Met Museum
 Why Born Enslaved! (1867) - plaster version at The Cleveland Museum of Art
Woman of African Descent (1868) - plaster with patina version at the Brooklyn Museum
 The Four Parts of the World Holding the Celestial Sphere - fountain and sculpture in Paris for which Why Born Enslaved! served as a model

1869 sculptures
1873 sculptures
Sculptures of the Cleveland Museum of Art
Sculptures of the Ny Carlsberg Glyptotek
Sculptures of the Metropolitan Museum of Art
Marble sculptures in Copenhagen
Sculptures in Paris
Marble sculptures
Slavery in art
Black people in art